Acrocercops melanoplecta is a moth of the family Gracillariidae. It is known from Hong Kong, India  (Meghalaya), Japan (Honshū, Tusima and the Ryukyu Islands), Nepal and Taiwan.

The wingspan is 7-10.8 mm.

The larvae feed on Castanopsis cuspidata, Castanopsis fissa, Castanopsis hystrix and Castanopsis tribuloides. They mine the leaves of their host plant.

References

melanoplecta
Moths of Asia
Moths described in 1908